Mark Adam Hyman (born November 22, 1959) is an American physician and author. He is the founder and medical director of The UltraWellness Center and was a columnist for The Huffington Post. Hyman was a regular contributor to the Katie Couric Show until the show's cancellation in 2013. He writes a blog called The Doctor’s Farmacy, which examines many topics related to human health and welfare.

Hyman is a proponent of functional medicine, a controversial form of alternative medicine. He is the board president of clinical affairs of the Institute for Functional Medicine. He was the editor-in-chief of, and is a contributing editor to, Alternative Therapies in Health and Medicine, a peer-reviewed journal. Hyman promotes a diet called peganism, which has been called a fad diet by some dietitians.

Education
Hyman was born in New York and graduated from Cornell University with a bachelor's degree in Asian Studies. He received his Doctor of Medicine degree from the University of Ottawa and completed his training at the Community Hospital of Santa Rosa in family medicine.

Career
Hyman started his medical career as a family physician in rural Idaho and later as an emergency department physician in Massachusetts. He was the co-medical director at Canyon Ranch in Lenox, Massachusetts, from 1996 to 2004. He opened The UltraWellness Center in a small shopping mall in Lenox after leaving Canyon Ranch.

Hyman is one of the most prominent proponents of functional medicine, a controversial form of alternative medicine; there is no definitive clinical evidence of its effectiveness. He is the board president of clinical affairs of the Institute for Functional Medicine, and is a contributing editor and former editor-in-chief to the journal Alternative Therapies in Health and Medicine. 

In 2009, Hyman testified before the United States Senate Committee on Health, Education, Labor, and Pensions about integrative medical care. Hyman also participated in a Partners In Health program to bring medical care to Haiti following the 2010 Haiti earthquake.

In December 2013, The Daniel Plan, a book Hyman co-authored with Pastor Rick Warren and Daniel Amen, became Number One on the New York Times bestseller list. Hyman is the author of several books on nutrition and health, such as 10 Day Detox Diet. Hyman was named the director of the Cleveland Clinic Center for Functional Medicine in September 2014. He appeared as a featured expert in the 2014 documentary film Fed Up.

He collaborated with Robert F. Kennedy Jr.'s 2014 book Thimerosal: Let the Science Speak, writing the preface in which he advocates for the removal of thimerosal from vaccines as a precautionary measure. Hyman convinced Kennedy to remove controversial chapters incorrectly linking thimerosal to autism. In 2016, Hyman joined environmentalists and civil rights leaders in calling for federal investigations into U.S. fluoridation policy, writing that communities of color are at particular risk of adverse health impacts.  

A 2014 New York Times article described Hyman’s relationship as a medical adviser to Bill and Hillary Clinton. 

Quackwatch lists Hyman's 2003 book Ultraprevention: The 6-Week Plan That Will Make You Healthy for Life as one of their non-recommended books due to promoting misinformation and containing unsubstantiated advice.

Peganism
Hyman endorsed a low-carbohydrate high-fat diet in his books Eat Fat Get Thin and The Eat Fat, Get Thin Cookbook, published in 2016. In these books, Hyman disputes commonly held ideas about consuming dietary fat. He says that saturated fat does not cause heart disease and obesity; processed carbohydrates do. Hyman recommends his readers transition to a pegan diet.

Hyman promoted the pegan diet, a plant-rich diet that combines principles of the paleo and vegan diets. The pegan diet is gluten-free and encourages consumption of nonstarchy vegetables with grass-fed organic meats and low-mercury fish. The diet consists of 75% plant foods and limits fruits to low-glycemic berries. The pegan diet opposes refined sugar and foods that can spike insulin production. The diet also opposes cow's milk but is not dairy free. Hyman allows the occasional organic goat or sheep milk, yogurt, kefir, grass-fed butter, ghee or cheese. Hyman has stated that the pegan diet can be defined by one simple rule: "If God made it, eat it; if man made it, leave it."

Hyman first wrote about the pegan diet in 2014 and outlined it in his book Food: What the Heck Should I Eat?, published in 2018.

Reception
Peganism has been termed by some dietitians as a fad diet. The diet's emphasis on vegetables and omega-3 fats is in accord to mainstream nutrition advice but has been criticized for limiting the consumption of beans and whole grains, which are associated with multiple health benefits such as reducing cardiovascular disease and cancer risk and supporting weight management. The pegan diet is restrictive and may cause magnesium, iron or calcium deficiency. Dietitian Abbey Sharp has commented that it "would be shocking to me if anyone was able to maintain this diet in the long run without incurring serious psychological damage".

A review in Publishers Weekly commented that "Pegan is a silly, paradoxical misnomer: no diet can be simultaneously paleo (meat, fats, and few vegetables/fruit) and vegan (with no animal products whatsoever). However, the diet’s recommendations are basically sound: fresh, locally sourced, preferably organic food; nothing refined or processed; and a focus on not raising blood sugar." 

Dietitian Carrie Dennett has written that "while the pegan diet is more moderate - and potentially easier to follow - than either of its dietary parents, it does restrict many nutritious foods for reasons that aren't quite supported by science." A downside to the diet is that it can be costly for those with low incomes who cannot afford the expensive "grass-fed" and "pasture-raised" animal source foods that Hyman recommends. Aisling Pigott, a dietitian and spokesperson for the British Dietetic Association, has suggested that the pegan diet is too restrictive to maintain and although some of its principles such as eating more plant-based foods and fewer processed foods are recommended for good health, "labeling this as a 'diet' is unethical and potentially dangerous and difficult to follow." 

Dietitian Alyssa Pike has disputed Hyman's claim that gluten should be avoided by people without a gluten allergy or intolerance and concluded that "the concept of this diet, combined with its number of restrictive rules, will likely make it hard to follow long-term and add to confusion about what to eat and why."

Oncologist Adil Akhtar has commented that "the pegan diet has taken good things from the vegan diet and attached it to some of the good things from the paleo diet. Both of them emphasize eating whole, natural foods, and avoiding eating anything processed or anything artificial. If you look at the pegan diet, it's about 75% vegan. The only difference is the source of protein in the vegan diet. Vegans get protein from beans and legumes. On the pegan diet, you're allowed to tap into grass-fed, healthy animal meat". Akhtar has noted that the pegan diet "looks quite close to the Mediterranean diet" and may be helpful to those who want to reduce their risk of developing cancer.

Selected publications

References

Further reading 

1959 births
20th-century American male writers
20th-century American non-fiction writers
20th-century American physicians
21st-century American male writers
21st-century American physicians
21st-century American non-fiction writers
American cookbook writers
American health and wellness writers
American male non-fiction writers
American medical writers
American primary care physicians
Cornell University alumni
Living people
Low-carbohydrate cookbook writers
Low-carbohydrate diet advocates
Pseudoscientific diet advocates
University of Ottawa alumni